Susan Kwan Shuk-hing (born 1954) is a Hong Kong judge. She has served as a Vice President of the Court of Appeal since April 2019.

Legal and judicial career

Kwan received an LLB in 1977 and a PCLL in 1978 from the University of Hong Kong. She was called to the Hong Kong Bar in 1979 and was a barrister in private practice until 1999. She was Honorary Secretary of the Hong Kong Bar Association from 1996 to 1999.

In 1999, Kwan was appointed as Deputy Registrar of the High Court. In 2001, she was appointed as a Judge of the Court of First Instance of the High Court. In 2002, she was appointed as the Judge in charge of the Companies and Bankruptcy List.

In 2009, Kwan was elevated to the Court of Appeal. In 2019, she was the first woman to be appointed as Vice President of the Court of Appeal.

Kwan is Editor-in-Chief of Company Law in Hong Kong: Insolvency and Company Law in Hong Kong: Practice and Procedure.

In October 2022, Kwan was part of a team of 3 judges who ruled against Jimmy Lai and said that "despite its importance to the freedom of the press, the protection afforded to journalistic material is not absolute."

References

Living people
1954 births
Alumni of the University of Hong Kong
Hong Kong judges
Barristers of Hong Kong